Trygve Bjørgo (5 January 1916 – 2 March 1997) was a Norwegian educator and lyricist.

Biography
He was born in Nord-Aurdal, Norway. 
He attended   Valdres People's College and  Grimeland School in Oslo.  He took a linguistic diploma with Norwegian language major at the University of Oslo in 1947.  He taught at Grimeland School from 1948-1949.
From 1949 he was a lecturer at Gudbrandsdal public school in Vinstra where he lived until 1964. From the fall that year he was appointed as principal of Valdres secondary school at Fagernes.

He published several works of poetry, including I minneskogen (1952), Mørker og morgon (1954), Vokstergrunn (1961), Frø i vind (1968), Kvit hest under hegg (1972), Auke åkeren (1979) and Straumar under yta (1986). He won the Sunnmørsprisen in 1961 for Vokstergrunn.
He was the chairman of Noregs Mållag from 1963 to 1965. he died during 1997 and was buried in the cemetery at Aurdal Church.

References

1916 births
1997 deaths
People from Nord-Aurdal
University of Oslo alumni
Norwegian educators
Nynorsk-language writers
Noregs Mållag leaders
Norwegian male poets
20th-century Norwegian male writers
20th-century Norwegian poets